Manilla River, a perennial stream that is part of the Namoi catchment within the Murray–Darling basin, is located in the Northern Tablelands district of New South Wales, Australia.

The stream (called a river) rises south–west of Barraba on the northern slopes of the Baldwins Range and drains a portion of the hill country on the western side of the New England highlands  and the southern slopes of the Nandewar Range; flowing generally north and east and to the town of Barraba.

The name of the river is derived from the Australian Aboriginal words of manilla, maneela, or muneela meaning "winding river" or "round about".

See also

 List of rivers of Australia
 Rivers of New South Wales

References

External links

 
Trout and salmon fishing rules

Rivers of New South Wales
Murray-Darling basin